Sarmīte Ķikuste (born 20 December 1962) is a Latvian physician and politician who served as a member of the eighth and ninth Saeimas.

References

1962 births
Living people
People from Balvi Municipality
New Era Party politicians
New Unity politicians
Deputies of the 8th Saeima
Deputies of the 9th Saeima
Latvian physicians